Never Back Down is a 2008 American martial arts film directed by Jeff Wadlow and starring Sean Faris, Cam Gigandet, Amber Heard, Cameron Fegreus and Djimon Hounsou. It tells the story of a frustrated and conflicted teenager who arrives at a new high school and discovers an underground fight club there.

The film was theatrically released on March 14, 2008. It received generally negative reviews from critics and grossed $41.6 million worldwide against a budget of $20 million.

Plot

Jake Tyler has recently moved from Iowa to  Orlando, Florida with his mother, Margret and younger brother Charlie who is a budding Tennis star, the move being in furtherance of his tennis career. His father died in a drunk-driving car crash accident, which is the subject of taunting from other classmates. He has a rising reputation with the students of his new school due to an internet video of him when he was a football player at his previous school fighting with a frustrated opponent player who makes derogatory remarks about Jake's father. Initially Jake has trouble fitting into his new school and while walking he sees Max Cooperman supposedly being beaten up by bullies. When Jake tries to intervene, he is told off by Max and his friends as the "bullying" was actually a consensual mixed martial arts fight. Later on, Jake is invited by classmate Baja Miller (whom he develops a crush on) to a party where he is unwillingly pulled into a fight with the MMA champion at the school, Ryan McCarthy, who is also Baja's boyfriend. Initially refusing to fight, Jake readily agrees to fight Ryan when he makes fun of Jake's father's death. Ryan easily defeats Jake, and video of the event circulates the school which leaves Jake humiliated.

Max Cooperman, after befriending Jake, introduces him to MMA and gets him connected with an instructor named Jean Roqua. Jake manages to pass a few of Roqua's physical tests and impresses him with his willpower and is accepted as his student. Roqua warns Jake that while he is under his instructorship, Jake cannot fight outside the gym no matter the reason and if he breaks the rule he will be thrown out of his gym. While Jake trains under Roqua, he initially has difficulty doing so due to his anger towards his incident with Ryan. Baja tries to make amends with Jake by apologizing for her role in the fight between him and Ryan but Jake refuses to forgive her. When Ryan shows no remorse for his fight with Jake or his sadistic tendencies, Baja breaks up with him, to which Ryan responds by aggressively grabbing her. When Jake tries to intervene to protect Baja, Ryan insults him about his father again and leaves. At practice, with Jake still furious over what happened, is told by Roqua to leave the gym until he cools off. Riding back from the gym with Max, Jake gets into a road rage brawl with a group of men whom he easily dispose of. Max films the video, which circulates around the school and raises Jake's social status which ends up agitating Ryan enough to confront Jake. After cornering Jake in the bathroom and roughing him up, he challenges Jake to compete in the Beatdown, an underground fighting tournament of which Ryan is the reigning champion. When Roqua discovers that Jake has fought outside the gym, he kicks him out and tells him he is not welcome back. A little while later, after Jake pleads with him, Roqua obliges and welcomes Jake back to the gym. Roqua puts Jake through more rigorous training which Jake uses in preparation for the Beatdown. After a workout, Roqua confides in Jake that he came from Brazil and is in self imposed exile. He tells Jake that his brother was a skilled MMA fighter and had handily beaten a local troublemaker who had challenged him. The man later returned with a gun and murdered his brother. Jean's father blames him for the death, saying he should have been watching out for him. Jake later on meets with Baja and apologizes for not forgiving her and they start a relationship. Jake eventually becomes reluctant to compete at the Beatdown seeing it as something Ryan wants, but his mind is changed after Ryan invites Max to his house and assaults him, leaving him on Jake's doorstep to be found. After leaving Max at the hospital, Jake goes to see Roqua and initially arguing over Jake's decision to participate in the Beatdown eventually relents and reminds Jake to "control the outcome".

Jake arrives at the tournament and both he and Ryan make their way through each round, each emerging victorious. Jake makes it to the semifinals in spite of an injury he received in the previous match. Baja arrives to not only support him, but to tell him that she understands why he insists on fighting: so that he would never have to fight again. After learning that Ryan was disqualified in his semifinal match due to an illegal eye gouge, Jake forfeits, seeing no reason to continue. While he and Baja attempt to leave, Ryan confronts him and the two finally fight outside in the parking lot. Jake is still limited by his injury, and Ryan at first gains the upper hand, applying a choke on Jake. However Jake escapes and knocks out Ryan using one of the first combinations Roqua taught him. Eventually, Jake wins the respect of his fellow students, including Ryan; and Roqua decides to go back to Brazil to reconcile with his father.

Cast
 Sean Faris as Jake "the Gridiron" Tyler, a trouble-prone teenager and the main protagonist.
 Amber Heard as Baja Miller, Jake's love interest.
 Cam Gigandet as Ryan "the Terror" McCarthy, Jake's rival, bully and the main antagonist.
 Djimon Hounsou as Jean Roqua, Max's mentor who agrees to train Jake.
 Evan Peters as Max Cooperman, a classmate who introduces Jake to MMA and befriends him.
 Wyatt Smith as Charlie Tyler, Jake's younger brother
 Leslie Hope as Margot Tyler, Jake's mother
 Chele Andre as Tiffany West, Baja's friend who likes Max.
 Tilky Jones as Eric
 Neil Brown Jr. as Aaron, Ryan's best friend.
 Lauren Leech as Jenny, Baja's friend who becomes Ryan's new girlfriend.
 Anthony Matos as Yellow Hummer Crew #1
 Daniel Hernandez as Yellow Hummer Crew #2
 Justin A. Williams as Yellow Hummer Crew #3

Production
The fighter actors went through three months of MMA training before filming began in Orlando, Florida.

One local high school was used when filming, that being Cypress Creek High School in Orlando, Fl.

Reception

Box office
Never Back Down debuted in 2,729 theaters at #3 with $8,603,195 in the opening weekend. After 2 weeks in cinemas, it garnered $18,890,093; and after one month the film earned $37,676,991 worldwide.

The film closed on June 5, 2008, after 84 days at the North American box office with $41,627,431 worldwide against a budget of $20 million.

Critical response

On Rotten Tomatoes, the film has an approval rating of 22% based on 83 reviews, with an average score of 4.4/10. The site's consensus states: "Though not without its pleasures, Never Back Down faithfully adheres to every imaginable fight movie cliché". On Metacritic, the film has a weighted average score of 39 out of 100 based on reviews from 22 critics, indicating "generally unfavorable reviews".

Gregory Kirschling of Entertainment Weekly gave the film a D, calling it "dopey. And with its emphasis on stupid violence, xylophone abs, and getting yourself on YouTube, it's yet another product that makes you feel bad about today's youth culture". Michael Phillips of Chicago Tribune gave the film two out of four stars, saying "[i]t's a little Karate Kid, a smidge of Fight Club (with none of the ironic ambivalence toward violence that David Fincher brought to that story), a lot of The O.C. (evil boy Gigandet played an evil boy on that series), and presto: probable hit".

Richard Roeper gave the film a positive review: "I laughed so much at the litany of clichés that I finally had to admit I was entertained from start to finish by this cheesy knock-off".

Movie historian Leonard Maltin cited the picture as "...wildly improbable and cliched, yet entertaining -- especially for fans of this genre. Cam Gigandet can glare with the best of them...All in all, the film Showdown tried to be".

Accolades

Home media

The DVD was released on July 29, 2008, and has so far sold 990,405 units, bringing in $18,495,324 in revenue. This does not include Blu-ray sales.

An unrated version called the "Extended Beat Down Edition", featuring nudity and more blood, was released on DVD on July 29, 2008.

Soundtrack

 "Above and Below" – The Bravery
 "Anthem for the Underdog" – 12 Stones
 "Teenagers" – My Chemical Romance
 "Someday" – Flipsyde
 "Wolf Like Me" – TV on the Radio
 "Under the Knife" – Rise Against
 "Time Won't Let Me Go" – The Bravery
 "Rock Star" – Chamillionaire & Lil Wayne
 "Be Safe" – The Cribs
 "Headstrong" – Trapt
 "False Pretense" – The Red Jumpsuit Apparatus
 "Orange Marmalade" – Mellowdrone
 "You Are Mine" – Mutemath
 "Stronger" – Kanye West feat Daft Punk
 "Crank That (Travis Barker Rock Remix)" – Soulja Boy Tell 'Em and Travis Barker
 "The Slam" – TobyMac
 "Lights Out" - Breaking Benjamin
 "Face the pain" - Stemm
 "…To Be Loved" – Papa Roach (featured during theatrical trailer)
The trance track played, when Ryan and his dad argue, is called "Estuera – Tales From The South (Jonas Steur's Flow Revision)", it did not feature on the soundtrack. It's from the album In Search of Sunrise 5: Los Angeles – Tiesto.

Sequels 

A 2011 sequel titled Never Back Down 2: The Beatdown was released with Evan Peters reprising his role as Max Cooperman. Directed by Michael Jai White in his directorial debut, the film stars White alongside Alex Meraz, Jillian Murray, MMA fighters Todd Duffee, Lyoto Machida, Scott Epstein and Australian actor-singer Dean Geyer.

A second sequel, released in 2016, titled Never Back Down: No Surrender was again directed by White, who also reprises his role as Case Walker. The film also stars Josh Barnett, Gillian Waters, Steven Quardos, Nathan Jones and Esai Morales.

A third sequel, titled Never Back Down: Revolt, which is directed by Kellie Madison, was released in 2021. Revolt does not feature any returning cast members, and stars Olivia Popica, Michael Bisping, Brooke Johnston, Vanessa Campos, Diana Hoyos, Neetu Chandra and James Faulkner.

References

 Modern Day Karate Kid packs a punch - Washington Square News (Feb. 22, 2008)
 never back down - The Duke Chronicle (March 5, 2008)
 What's Your Fight? Hollyscoop (March 7, 2008)
 
 Never Back Down Taking A Blog Beating UFC Daily (March 8, 2008)
 
 
  2 out of 4 stars.
 Actors elevate fight film plot you know Las Vegas Sun (March 14, 2008)
 
 Never Back Down Newsday (March 14, 2008)
 
 Fight feature: Wadlow's second film a manly movie The Hook 23 (March 13, 2008)

External links
 
 
 

2008 films
American coming-of-age films
American teen films
American martial arts films
2000s English-language films
Films set in Florida
Films shot in Florida
Kickboxing films
2008 martial arts films
Mandalay Pictures films
Martial arts tournament films
Mixed martial arts films
Underground fighting films
Summit Entertainment films
Films directed by Jeff Wadlow
Films scored by Michael Wandmacher
2000s American films